Destiny, Florida  is a large-scale urban development project in Osceola County near Yeehaw Junction, Florida. The project is a joint partnership between the Pugliese Development Co. of Delray Beach and FD Destiny LLC, owned by Fred DeLuca. It was one of 16 initial projects of “climate positive" real estate developments supported by the Clinton Climate Initiative. In 2010, the project was delayed due to lawsuits and opposition from Florida state agencies.

Proposed development
The project plans for the eventual development of a  property to include 88,000 to 100,000 residential units for a population of 200,000 to 250,000 residents. The proposed infrastructure is based on a large-scale "climate positive" community entirely supported through sustainable energy. Sources of energy would include a 30MW solar array, a waste management system for extracting methane, and an energy farm for the production of biofuel.

Controversy
In 2009 Osceola County proposed an amendment in its comprehensive building plan for a "new city overlay on more than 500,000 acres in a rural area in the county", which would allow for the construction of the Destiny development as well as several other large-scale projects. The Florida Department of Community Affairs opposed the amendment, citing the Florida’s Growth Management Act and stating the amendment would contribute to urban sprawl.

The Air Force said this would interfere with flight training.

In September 2009, Fred DeLuca filed suit against Anthony Pugliese of the Pugliese Development Company claiming mismanagement of the Destiny project and misuse of project funding for personal use.  On September 29, 2009, Anthony Pugliese and Fred DeLuca entered into an Agreed Order whereby Pugliese agreed to "temporarily relinquish control" of the project. In December 2009, Pugliese filed a five billion dollar lawsuit against DeLuca for fraudulent financial practices associated with creating loans for the Destiny project.

In April 2010, Osceola County postponed further development of the comprehensive plan due to the state opposition and the court litigation.

In June 2016, a judge ordered Pugliese pay $13 million to DeLuca's estate.

References

External links 
 https://web.archive.org/web/20110202125817/http://destinyfl.com/
 http://puglieseco.com/

Proposed populated places in the United States
Planned cities in the United States
Unincorporated communities in Osceola County, Florida
Planned communities in Florida
Unincorporated communities in Florida